Hare Peak is an ice-free peak,  high, at the north end of the ridge forming the east side of Leigh Hunt Glacier, in the Queen Maud Mountains of Antarctica. It was named by the New Zealand Geological Survey Antarctic Expedition (1961–62) for Clarence Hare, a member of the British National Antarctic Expedition (1901–04).

References

Mountains of the Ross Dependency
Dufek Coast